Boglár László is a Hungarian politician who served as spokesperson of the Hungarian government from 6 October 2004 to 12 September 2005. After that Ferenc Gyurcsány appointed her press officer of the Prime Minister.

References
 dunatv.hu

Living people
21st-century Hungarian women politicians
Government spokespersons of Hungary
Year of birth missing (living people)